Hero Worship is a 2003 album released by singer/comedian/actress Sandra Bernhard. The album is a live recording of her one-woman show of the same title; it combines comedic monologues and musical performances. It was primarily sold at her live shows until it was made available on her official website.

In the performance Bernhard does what she is best known for: she rips apart celebrity culture while commenting on events of the time. Among the topics she addresses: the program Britney Spears, Angie Harmon, terrorism and animal rights.

The first pressing of the CD was made on CD-Rs and sold at shows. It looks identical to consequent pressings but has pink text instead of yellow.

Track listing
Holding Out For A Hero
9/11
Benefits
Billboards
Fashion-ating
Trannie Hookers
Mug Shots
Angie Harmon
Famous Quotes
All The Great Times
San Francisco
Youth Quake
Next Time
Tambourine Sounds!
PETA
Melissa Rivers
The Weather Channel
Al Jazeera Moments
Inner Strength
Kentucky Rain
Little Red Corvette

Sandra Bernhard albums
2003 albums
2000s comedy albums